Dawid Markelowicz Janowski  (25 May 1868 – 15 January 1927; often spelled David) was a French chess player. Several openings variations are named after Janowski.

Biography 
Born into a Jewish-Polish family in Wołkowysk, Russian Empire (now Belarus), he settled in Paris around 1890 and began his professional chess career in 1894. He won tournaments in Monte Carlo 1901, Hanover 1902 and tied for first at Vienna 1902. 

Janowski was devastating against the older masters such as Wilhelm Steinitz (+5−2), Mikhail Chigorin (+17−4=4) and Joseph Henry Blackburne (+6−2=2).  He had minus scores, however, against newer players such as Siegbert Tarrasch (+5−9=3), Frank Marshall (+28−34=18), Akiba Rubinstein (+3−5), Géza Maróczy (+5−10=5) and Carl Schlechter (+13−20=13). He was outclassed by world champions Emanuel Lasker (+4−25=7) and José Raúl Capablanca (+1−9=1), but scored respectably against Alexander Alekhine (+2−4=2). In particular, he was able to beat at least once each of the first four world champions, a feat shared with Siegbert Tarrasch alone.

Janowski played three matches against Emanuel Lasker: two friendly matches in 1909 (+2−2 and +1−7=2) and one match for the world chess championship in 1910 (−8=3). The longer 1909 match has sometimes been called a world championship match, but research by Edward Winter indicates that the title was not at stake.

In July–August 1914, he was playing an international chess tournament, the 19th DSB Congress (German Chess Federation Congress) in Mannheim, Germany, with four wins, four draws and three losses (seventh place), when World War I broke out.
Players at Mannheim representing countries now at war with Germany were interned. He, as well as Alexander Alekhine, was interned but released to Switzerland after a short internment.
In 1915, he left Europe for the United States and spent the next nine years there before returning to Paris. At New York 1916, in the final, he shared second place with Oscar Chajes, after José Raúl Capablanca. He won at Atlantic City 1921 (the eighth American Chess Congress) and took third place at Lake Hopatcong 1923 (the ninth ACC).

He died in France on 15 January 1927 of tuberculosis.

Playing style 
Janowski played very quickly and was known as a sharp tactician who was devastating with the bishop pair. Capablanca annotated some Janowski games with great admiration, and said, "when in form [he] is one of the most feared opponents who can exist".  Capablanca noted that Janowski's greatest weakness as a player was in the endgame, and Janowski reportedly told him, "I detest the endgame."  American champion Frank Marshall remembered Janowski's talent and his stubbornness. In Marshall's Best Games of Chess he wrote that Janowski "could follow the wrong path with greater determination than any man I ever met!" Reuben Fine remembered Janowski as a player of considerable talent, but a "master of the alibi" with respect to his defeats. Fine said that his losses invariably occurred because it was too hot, or too cold, or the windows were open too far, or not far enough. He also noted that Janowski was sometimes unpopular with his colleagues because of his predilection for doggedly playing on even in an obviously lost position, hoping his opponent might blunder. Edward Lasker in his book Chess Secrets I Learned from the Masters recalled that Janowski was an inveterate but undisciplined gambler who would often lose all of his chess winnings at the roulette wheel.

Legacy 

Several openings variations carry Janowski's name.

Notes

References 

Bibliography

Further reading

External links
 
 Edward Winter, Janowsky Jottings (1998)
 “Lasker v Janowsky, Paris, 1909” by Edward Winter

1868 births
1927 deaths
Jewish chess players
Polish chess players
French chess players
Chess theoreticians
19th-century chess players
20th-century chess players
20th-century deaths from tuberculosis
Tuberculosis deaths in France